The America East Conference softball tournament is the conference championship tournament in college softball for the America East Conference.  The winner receives the conference's automatic bid to the NCAA Division I softball tournament.

Tournament
The top 6 teams compete in the double-elimination tournament, with the top two seeds receiving a single bye.

Champions

Year-by-year
{| class="wikitable"
|-
! Year
! School
! Venue
! MVP
|-
| 1992 ||  || Philadelphia, PA || Shannon Downey, Boston University
|-
| 1993 ||  || Newark, DE || Deb Smith, Maine
|-
| 1994 ||  || Newark, DE || Erin Phillips, Hofstra
|-
| 1995 ||  || Newark, DE || 
|-
| 1996 ||  || Burlington, VT || Audrey West, Boston University
|-
| 1997 ||  || Hempstead, NY || Niclana Tolmasoff, Boston University
|-
| 1998 ||  || Newark, DE || Jen Smith, Hofstra
|-
| 1999 ||  || Burlington, VT || Alicia Smith, Hofstra
|-
| 2000 ||  || Hofstra Softball Stadium • Hempstead, NY || Alicia Smith, Hofstra
|-
| 2001 ||  || Newark, DE || Shannon Luther, Hofstra
|-
| 2002 ||  || Burlington, VT || Robyn Horrick, Boston University
|-
| 2003 ||  || University Field • Stony Brook, NY || Julie Henneke, Boston University
|-
| 2004 ||  || Mike Kessock Field • Orono, ME || Lauren Dulkis, Maine
|-
| 2005 ||  || University Field • Stony Brook, NY || Amanda Morin, Albany
|-
| 2006 ||  || Mike Kessock Field • Orono, ME || Casey Halloran, Albany
|-
| 2007 ||  || Boston University Softball Field • Boston, MA || Casey Halloran, Albany
|-
| 2008 ||  || Albany Field • Albany, NY || Alyssa Struzenberg, Stony Brook
|-
| 2009 ||  || University Field • Stony Brook, NY || Cassidi Hardy, Boston University
|-
| 2010 ||  || Mike Kessock Field • Orono, ME || Cassidi Hardy, Boston University
|-
| 2011 ||  || Boston University Softball Field • Boston, MA || Brittany MacFawn, Albany
|-
| 2012 ||  || Boston University Softball Field • Boston, MA || Holli Floetker, Boston University
|-
| 2013 ||  || Varsity Field • Vestal, NY || Allison Cukrov, Stony Brook
|-
| 2014 ||  || University Field • Stony Brook, NY || Brittany MacFawn, Albany
|-
| 2015 ||  || University Field • Stony Brook, NY || Sarah Miller, Binghamton
|-
| 2016 ||  || Varsity Field • Vestal, NY || Erin Boganovich, Maine
|-
| 2017 ||  || Varsity Field • Vestal, NY || Devin Durando, Albany
|-
| 2018 ||  || Varsity Field • Vestal, NY || Celeste Verdolivo, Albany
|-
| 2019 ||  || Hartford Softball Field • West Hartford, CT || Courtney Coppersmith, UMBC
|-
| 2020 ||colspan=3 align=center|Canceled due to COVID-19 pandemic
|-
| 2021 ||  || UMBC Softball Stadium • Baltimore, MD || Sierra Pierce, UMBC
|-
| 2022 ||  || University Field • Stony Brook, NY || 
|}

By schoolItalics indicates no longer sponsors softball in the America East Conference.''

References

 
1992 establishments in Pennsylvania
Recurring sporting events established in 1992